Tage im Hotel is a German film directed by . It was released on the February 20 1983 during Berlin International Film Festival.

Plot 
After a three-year stay abroad in the United States, the young Gernot returns to Germany with his girlfriend Kathy, whom he met during his time there. Gernot doesn't really know what to do in his home country and then decides to travel to Corsica with Kathy first. The couple rent a hotel there. Gernot told Kathy that he would like to emigrate because he didn't really like it in Germany. His goal is South America. A friend of his works in Nicaragua.

Other friends of Gernot are active in the film industry, including his homosexual friend Martin Palm and Sarah Lenhart. Gernot watches one of her films at the hotel in Corsica to kill time. In the film, the character played by Sarah shoots her boyfriend's best friend when she thinks he wants to approach her sexually.

After Gernot had spent a few days with his friends and then returned to Kathy, she informed him that she would return to her native America. He probably didn't feel it, but it doesn't work with them. Shortly afterwards, Gernot says goodbye to Kathie, who has booked a ship passage. Unlike Kathy, Gernot remains undecided and continues to spend most of his time in his hotel room. At least he takes the initiative and calls Sarah to meet her. Gernot also has contact with guest Christoph Liedloff, who is also staying at the hotel, with whom he talks about the world's problems.

With Sarah, Gernot kills time and after a while comes to the decision that he will probably go back to Germany because he needs money. Being a gifted cartoonist, he is considering selling his work, perhaps to get a grip on his financial problems.

Cast 
 Rolf Witt as Gernot
  as Kathy
 Maja Maranow as Sarah Lenhart
  as Christoph Liedloff
  as Martin Palm
  as Esther Kraus

External links  
 
 Tage im Hotel at berlinale.de

1983 films
West German films
1980s German-language films
German drama films
1983 drama films
1980s German films